Alicja Rosolska (born 1 December 1985) is a professional tennis player from Poland.

On 9 June 2003, she reached her best singles ranking of world No. 636. On 10 June 2019, she peaked at No. 23 in the doubles rankings.

Rosolska has won nine doubles titles on the WTA Tour in her career (in Cachantún with Līga Dekmeijere, in Marbella with Klaudia Jans-Ignacik, in Budapest with Anabel Medina Garrigues, in Monterrey with Gabriela Dabrowski, in Bastad with Andreea Mitu, in St. Petersburg with Jeļena Ostapenko, again in Monterrey with Nao Hibino, in Nottingham with Abigail Spears and in Charleston with Anna-Lena Grönefeld), as well as 14 doubles titles on the ITF Circuit.

She represented Poland in Fed Cup and both 2008 and 2012 Summer Olympics, in the women's doubles competitions again with Jans-Ignacik.

Personal life
Her sister, Aleksandra Rosolska, is also a tennis player.

Professional career

2004–07: First WTA doubles final, Grand Slam debut
In August 2004, she played her first WTA final in doubles event at the Warsaw Open in Sopot. Alongside Klaudia Jans-Ignacik, she lost to Nuria Llagostera Vives and Marta Marrero.

During the season of 2005, she played two WTA finals but failed to win the trophy in both of them. First, she reached the final of the Tier II Warsaw Open in April 2005. She then, in July, played at the Palermo Open. However, she lost both finals alongside Jans. At the 2005 Zurich Open, she made her Tier I debut but lost in the first round.

At the 2007 Australian Open, she made her Grand Slam debut. Partnering with Vasilisa Bardina, she lost in the second round. Later, she reached second round of the French Open and US Open as well.

2008–09: First WTA doubles title, Olympics debut
In February 2008, she won her first WTA doubles title at the Cachantún Cup. It was her first final that she not played alongside Jans. Alongside Līga Dekmeijere, she defeated Mariya Koryttseva and Julia Schruff in the straight-sets. In August, she made her debut at the Summer Olympics in Beijing. She played only in doubles event, where alongside Jans, she lost in the first round to Lindsay Davenport and Liezel Huber. At the 2008 US Open, she reached Grand Slam third round for the first time.

Start of the season of 2009 was promising due to final in the first week at the Brisbane International. She returned to play alongside Jans but she lost to Anna-Lena Grönefeld and Vania King. In April, she won title at the Andalucia Tennis Experience as her first title with Jans. In October, she reached another WTA final at the Linz Open but finished as a runner-up.

2010–11: Three Premier 5/Mandatory QF, second WTA doubles title
In the first four months of 2010, Rosolska advanced to three semifinal. Right after that she reached her first Premier 5/Mandatory quarterfinal at the Italian Open. By the end of the year, she reached four more semifinals.

Rosolska was successful during the first two weeks in 2011. She started season with the final of the Brisbane International (her second there), followed up then with semifinal of the Sydney International. In March, she reached her second career Premier 5/Mandatory quarterfinal, this time at the Indian Wells Open. Prior to French Open, she played final of the Brussels Open alongside Jans but lost after three set match against Andrea Hlaváčková and Galina Voskoboeva. Right after Wimbledon, she won title at the Budapest Grand Prix, partnering with Anabel Medina Garrigues. Later, at the Canadian Open, she played another Premier 5/Mandatory quarterfinal.

2012–14: New Premier 5/Mandatory QF, completing Grand Slam 3R

At the 2012 Australian Open, she played her first third round there. That was her second one at a Grand Slam championship. Two weeks later, she reached semifinals of the Premier Open GdF Suez in Paris but then withdraw alongside Monica Niculescu. The week before the French Open, she advanced to the final of the Premier Brussels Open. For the second time in-a-row she failed to lift the trophy. In August, she played at the London Olympics, partnering with Jans; they lost to Maria Kirilenko and Nadia Petrova. She then entered the final of the Tournoi de Québec carpet tournament, but lost in three sets. At the China Open, she reached another Premier 5/Mandatory quarterfinal.

The first half of the 2013 season was marked with a lot of losing in the either first or second rounds. In late May, she reached semifinals of the Premier Brussels Open, for the third consecutive year. At the French Open, she reached third round as her first one there and third Grand Slam in total. At the Canadian Open, she advanced to another Premier 5/Mandatory quarterfinal. She finished the year with the Linz Open final and the semifinal of the Premier Kremlin Cup.

Despite the weak performances in 2014, Rosolska reached the third round of the US Open, completing third round of all four Grand Slam tournaments. Another big result during that year was the semifinal of the Linz Open.

2015–17: Four more WTA doubles titles, Elite Trophy debut
In March 2015, she won title at the Monterrey Open alongside Gabriela Dabrowski. She continued with reaching quarterfinals of the Premier 5/Mandatory tournaments at the Italian Open and later at the Wuhan Open. For the first time, she played at the WTA Elite Trophy alongside Dabrowski. However, they lost both round-robin matches.

In late July 2016, she won title at the Swedish Open, partnering with Andreea Mitu.

At the 2017 St. Petersburg Trophy, she won her first Premier-level title alongside Jeļena Ostapenko. In April, she won another WTA title at the Monterrey Open alongside Nao Hibino. At the Wuhan Open, she reached new Premier 5/Mandatory quarterfinal. For the second time, she qualified for the WTA Elite Trophy. This time she played alongside Anna Smith, but lost again both round-robin matches.

2018–19: Wimbledon semifinal, first win at the Elite Trophy
In 2018, her first significant performance was at the Premier Dubai Championships where she reached semifinal. Two weeks later, she reached semifinal of the Ladies Open Lugano. At the Madrid Open, she reached quarterfinals. Her grass-court season was successful. She started with the title at the Nottingham Open as her first grass title. At Wimbledon, she reached her first significant Grand Slam result, reaching semifinals. Partnering with Abigail Spears, she lost to eventual champions Barbora Krejčíková and Kateřina Siniaková. She also reached semifinals at the Premier Connecticut Open and quarterfinal of the Premier Mandatory China Open. At the WTA Elite Trophy, she played alongside Mihaela Buzărnescu and won first match in the round-robin stage but then lost to the following one.

In January 2019, she advanced to the final of the Premier Sydney International. In April, she won the title of the green clay Premier Charleston Open. On her way to the trophy, alongside Grönefeld, she won all matches in the straight-sets. At the Elite Trophy, she lost both matches in the round-robin stage alongside Darija Jurak.

2021–22: Major & two WTA 1000 quarterfinals, two more finals
At the 2020 Summer Olympics, postponed to 2021 due to COVID-19, Rosolska lost in the first round, alongside Magda Linette, to Bethanie Mattek-Sands and Jessica Pegula.

In January 2022, she reached the semifinals of the Adelaide International 2 partnering Erin Routliffe.

They reached the quarterfinals on the WTA 1000 level at the Qatar Open and the Miami Open.

The pair also reached two more finals at the WTA 500 St. Petersburg Ladies' Trophy and the WTA 250 Bad Homburg Open.

At the French Open she reached the third round for the third time in her career with Routliffe. She reunited with Routliffe for the Wimbledon Championships where they reached the quarterfinals.

Performance timeline

Only main-draw results in WTA Tour, Grand Slam tournaments, Fed Cup/Billie Jean King Cup and Olympic Games are included in win–loss records.

Doubles
Current after the 2023 Australian Open.

Grand Slam finals

Mixed doubles: 1 (runner-up)

WTA career finals

Doubles: 25 (9 titles, 16 runner-ups)

ITF finals

Doubles: 25 (14 titles, 11 runner–ups)

Notes

References

External links
 
 
 
 

1985 births
Living people
Tennis players from Warsaw
Polish female tennis players
Tennis players at the 2008 Summer Olympics
Tennis players at the 2012 Summer Olympics
Olympic tennis players of Poland
Universiade medalists in tennis
Universiade silver medalists for Poland
Medalists at the 2009 Summer Universiade
Tennis players at the 2020 Summer Olympics
21st-century Polish women